This is a list of cabinet ministers in Finland who have resigned from their office. There are no Cabinet reshuffles or fall of cabinets in the list.

List

References

Lists of government ministers of Finland